Eirenis barani, also known commonly as Baran's dwarf racer, is a species of snake in the family Colubridae. The species is endemic to the Near East.

Etymology
The specific name, barani, is in honor of Turkish herpetologist İbrahim Baran.

Geographic range
E. barani is found in southern Turkey and northwestern Syria.

Habitat

Description
The dorsal scales are smooth, and are arranged in 17 rows at midbody.

Reproduction
E. barani is oviparous.

References

Further reading
Mahlow K, Tillack F, Schmidtler JF, Müller J (2013). " An annotated checklist, description and key to the dwarf snakes of the genus Eirenis Jan, 1863 (Reptilia: Squamata: Colubridae), with special emphasis on the dentition". Vertebrate Zoology 63 (1): 41–85. 
Schmidtler JF (1988). "Eirenis barani n. sp. aus dem Mediterranen Süden der Türkei ". Salamandra 24 (4): 203–214. (Eirenis barani, new species). (in German, with an abstract in English).
Sindaco R, Jeremčenko VK, Venchi A, Grieco C (2013). The Reptiles of the Western Palearctic, Volume 2: Annotated Checklist and Distributional Atlas of the Snakes of Europe, North Africa, Middle East and Central Asia, with an Update to Volume 1. (Monographs of the Societas Herpetologica Italica). Latina, Italy: Edizioni Belvedere. 543 pp. .

Eirenis
Reptiles described in 1988
Taxonomy articles created by Polbot
Reptiles of Syria
Reptiles of Turkey